On 30 August 2022, Mikhail Gorbachev, the eighth and final leader of the Soviet Union, died after a long illness at the Moscow Central Clinical Hospital in Russia. Gorbachev was the last living Soviet leader following the death of Georgy Malenkov in 1988, and is the only one to have been born during the Soviet Union's existence. At the age of 91 years old, Gorbachev is the longest-lived ruler of Russia to date, having lived longer than Alexander Kerensky and Vasili Kuznetsov, who both died at 89 years old. On 3 September, a funeral was held for Gorbachev, and he was buried later that day.

Gorbachev's death provoked responses from many current and former world leaders and politicians.

Funeral
Gorbachev's body lay in state on 3 September within the Pillar Hall of the House of the Unions in Moscow, which has historically been used to hold state funeral services for high-ranking officials and leaders, including for Joseph Stalin after his death in 1953. Notably, unlike his successor, Boris Yeltsin, Gorbachev would not be granted a state funeral. However, Kremlin spokesperson Dmitry Peskov did announce that Gorbachev would be given "elements of a state funeral", such as a guard of honor and partial government organization. It was also announced that Russian president Vladimir Putin would not attend Gorbachev's funeral, a move that attracted media attention. A statement from the Kremlin alleged this was due to his busy schedule.

A large public turnout resulted in public viewing of Gorbachev's casket and encased body being extended from two hours to four hours. This large public viewing attendance came in spite of reports that many Russians blame Gorbachev for launching reforms that caused economic chaos and for letting the Soviet Union fall apart. Despite having elements similar to a state funeral, including the national flag draping Gorbachev's coffin while being accompanied with goose-stepping guards firing shots in the air and a small band playing the Russian anthem, it was alleged that Putin avoided giving Gorbachev an official state funeral so he could avoid being obliged to attend it and also be required to invite world leaders. 

Among those who attended Gorbachev's funeral were family, friends, foreign ambassadors to Russia—including ambassadors from the United States, the United Kingdom, and Germany, among others—Hungarian Prime Minister Viktor Orbán, and Russian government figures, including Dmitry Medvedev. Aside from Orbán, no other foreign leaders were shown to be in attendance. Presiding over the funeral procession was Gorbachev's close friend and Nobel peace prize laureate Dmitry Muratov. Gorbachev was buried the same day at the Novodevichy Cemetery in Moscow next to his wife, Raisa Gorbacheva, in accordance with his will.

Reactions

Domestic

Political reaction
Russian president Vladimir Putin expressed his "deepest condolences" over the death of Gorbachev, and announced that he would send a telegram of condolence to his family and friends. Naina Yeltsina, widow of former Russian president Boris Yeltsin, said that Gorbachev "sincerely wanted to change the Soviet system" and transform the USSR into a "free and peaceful state". Russian Prime Minister Mikhail Mishustin called Gorbachev "a brilliant statesman".

State Duma deputy Vitaly Milonov (United Russia) was less positive in his outlook of Gorbachev, arguing that Gorbachev was "worse than Hitler for Russia". Gennady Zyuganov, General Secretary of the Communist Party of the Russian Federation, told TASS that Gorbachev was a leader whose rule brought “absolute sadness, misfortune and problems” for “all the peoples of our country”.

Wider reaction
Although Gorbachev was mourned in the Western world, reactions to his death within Russia were less positive. Reporting on Gorbachev's death, Russian media had little to say regarding his death; Russian tabloid newspaper Komsomolskaya Pravda stated that Gorbachev had "changed the world too irreversibly for his ideological opponents". 

Russian opposition leader Alexei Navalny, in a series of tweets, offered his condolences to Gorbachev's family and friends, stating that Gorbachev's legacy would be "evaluated far more favorably by posterity than by contemporaries". Navalny's ally, Lyubov Sobol, offered a similar sentiment, stating that the dissolution of the Soviet Union was an inevitability and "the role of Gorbachev in history in Russia will still be appreciated". Liberal journalist Dmitry Muratov, editor of the banned opposition newspaper Novaya Gazeta, wrote in an article that Gorbachev gave Russians “thirty years of peace without a threat of a global nuclear war”. Similar thoughts were echoed by Alexei Venediktov, editor of the banned Echo of Moscow radio station.

Russian former chief rabbi Pinchas Goldschmid praised Gorbachev for lifting travel restrictions on Soviet citizens, arguing that "three million Soviet Jews owe him their freedom".

International

Allies of Gorbachev were positive in their posthumous reflection on him. Former United States Secretary of State James Baker III, who had served as the White House Chief of Staff during the Reagan administration, described Gorbachev as "a giant who steered his great nation towards democracy". The Reagan Foundation released a statement in memoriam of Gorbachev.

António Guterres, Secretary-General of the United Nations, described Gorbachev as "a one-of-a-kind statesman who changed the course of history", going on to say that "[h]e did more than any other individual to bring about the peaceful end of the Cold War".

In Europe, European Commission president Ursula von der Leyen called Gorbachev a "trusted and respected leader". European Parliament president Roberta Metsola echoed similar statements.

Queen Elizabeth II in her message to the Russian people regarding Gorbachev's death recalled "much warmth" from his 1989 state visit to Great Britain, stating that "through his courage and vision, he gained the admiration, affection and respect of the British people". Her personal statement was made public by Embassy of the United Kingdom, Moscow in its official Vkontakte account.  

Former German chancellor Angela Merkel referenced the fall of the Berlin Wall in her statement regarding Gorbachev's death. Merkel, who hails from East Germany, said that the "world has lost a one-of-a-kind world leader" and that he "wrote history". Likewise, current German chancellor Olaf Scholz commented on Gorbachev dissolving the Iron Curtain. French president Emmanuel Macron, like Merkel, noted that Gorbachev "changed common history".

Australian prime minister Anthony Albanese called Gorbachev a "man of warmth, hope, resolve and enormous courage". Former Prime Minister Paul Keating also sent condolences.

Through a press secretariat, Bulgarian president Rumen Radev condoled with Gorbachev's family, citing Gorbachev's belief in free will as a catalyst for the unification of Europe. Romanian president Klaus Iohannis and former president Ion Iliescu both made comments in the wake of his death.

Canadian prime minister Justin Trudeau commended Gorbachev for his accomplishments during his time. Former Prime Minister Brian Mulroney also sent condolences. 

United States president Joe Biden, whom Gorbachev had met in 2009 following a visit to the White House, noted Gorbachev's paradigms of glasnost and perestroika and commended him for working with Ronald Reagan on ending the nuclear arms race.

Israeli president Isaac Herzog described Gorbachev as a "brave and visionary leader".

Japanese prime minister Fumio Kishida, in a news conference, praised Gorbachev for "supporting the abolishment of nuclear weapons"; Kishida hails from Hiroshima.

Ministry of Foreign Affairs of China spokesperson Zhao Lijian offered condolences to Gorbachev's family stating that he "made positive contribution to the normalization of relations between China and the Soviet Union." Despite Zhao's condolences, Gorbachev's death had mixed reactions in China, where he was credited with normalizing Sino-Soviet relations, but at the same time negatively viewed for bringing about the dissolution of the Soviet Union, as the Chinese Communist Party views the fall of the Soviet Union a "major ideological catastrophe that cast a shadow over their own future."

See also

Death and state funeral of Vladimir Lenin
Death and state funeral of Joseph Stalin
Death and state funeral of Leonid Brezhnev
Death and state funeral of Boris Yeltsin

References

External links

 

2022 in Moscow
August 2022 events in Russia
September 2022 events in Russia
Deaths by person in Moscow
Events affected by the 2022 Russian invasion of Ukraine
Funerals in Russia
Funerals by person
Death and funeral